Birte Melsen (born 9 June 1939) is an orthodontist from Denmark. She was the past President of European Orthodontic Society in 2004 and has made significant contributions in the field of orthodontics with her research, publishing about 350 papers in scientific journals on topics related to Anchorage (orthodontics) and adult orthodontics.

Life and career
Birthe Melsen was born in Aabenraa, Denmark in 1939. She received her dental degree in 1964 from Aarhus University in Aarhus, Denmark. Melsen specialized in orthodontics in the year of 1971 and received her orthodontic certificate in 1974 from Royal Dental College. She became Head of Department of Orthodontics at the same college in 1975 and is currently serving at that position. Melsen also works as part-time at a private practice in Lübeck, Germany. She has published a textbook called Adult Orthodontics in 2012. Melsen and co-workers in Denmark, designed the Aarhus Mini-Implant (Medicon eG, Tuttlingen, Germany. ScanOrto A/S, Charlottenlund, Denmark) and furnished scientific evidence for the possibility of immediate loading of mini-screw implants.

Awards
 Order of the Dannebrog, 1st degree, 2000
 Robert Strange Award in Orthodontics, 1986
 Jarabak Scholarship, 1986

Positions held
 1976 - President, Scandinavian Orthodontic Society
 1984 - President, Nordic Orthodontic Society
 1988 - President, Danish Orthodontic Society
 1989 - President, Third International Symposium on Dentofacial Development, Aarhus, Denmark
 1990 - Vice-president, European Orthodontic Society Congress, Copenhagen, Denmark
 1993-96 Vice-president of International Symposium on ComprehensiveManagement of Craniofacial Anomalies
 1994-97 President of the Danish Orthodontic Society
 1994 - Associate Editor of Orthodontics and Craniofacial Research
 2004 - President, European Orthodontic Society

References

Orthodontists
1939 births
Living people
People from Aabenraa Municipality